Nordhavets mænd is a 1939 Danish family adventure film directed by Lau Lauritzen.

Cast
Johannes Meyer as Sigurds far, konsul Jernø
Lau Lauritzen as Sigurd Jernø
Poul Reichhardt as Lorens
Gull-Maj Norin as  Aino Flatø
Knud Almar as Edwin Flatø
Victor Montell as Gamle August
Carlo Wieth as Kaptajn Ek
Paul Rohde as Sverre
Thorkil Lauritzen as Kok
Ingeborg Pehrson as Gamle Lise

External links

1939 films
1930s Danish-language films
1939 adventure films
Danish black-and-white films
Films directed by Lau Lauritzen Jr.
Danish adventure films